Black Ice is a Canadian documentary film, directed by Hubert Davis, produced by Vinay Virmani and slated for release in 2022. Based in part on Darril Fosty and George Fosty's 2004 non-fiction book Black Ice: The Lost History of the Colored Hockey League of the Maritimes, 1895-1925, the film presents a history of the Coloured Hockey League of the Maritimes of the early 20th century, and the lingering history of anti-black racism in the sport of ice hockey.

Executive producers of the film included Drake, LeBron James and Maverick Carter.

The film premiered at the 2022 Toronto International Film Festival, where it was the winner of the People's Choice Award for Documentaries.

The film was named to TIFF's annual year-end Canada's Top Ten list for 2022.

References

External links 
 

2022 films
2022 documentary films
Canadian sports documentary films
Canadian ice hockey films
Documentary films about Black Canadians
2020s English-language films
Documentary films about ice hockey
Films directed by Hubert Davis
2020s Canadian films